Zelkova sicula is a species of Zelkova in the family Ulmaceae, endemic to Sicily.

Description

Conservation
The only known population, found in 1991, consists of 200–250 plants growing on the Monti Iblei area, in Buccheri, in southeast Sicily near Syracuse. This population are all thought to derive from possibly just one clone, or at the most only a very few distinct individuals. Its natural habitat is temperate forests and Mediterranean-type shrubby vegetation. It is threatened by habitat loss. The IUCN list this species as Critically Endangered.

Accessions
Icomb Place gardens, as Z. sicula

Further reading

References

External links

sicula
Endemic flora of Sicily
Critically endangered plants
Critically endangered biota of Europe
Plants described in 1992
Taxonomy articles created by Polbot